St Helena's Church is a Grade I listed parish church in the Church of England in South Scarle, Nottinghamshire.

History

The church dates from the 12th century.

It is part of a group of parishes which includes 
St Bartholomew's Church, Langford
St Giles' Church, Holme
St Cecilia's Church, Girton
All Saints' Church, Harby
St George the Martyr's Church, North & South Clifton
All Saints' Church, Collingham
St John the Baptist's Church, Collingham
Holy Trinity Church, Besthorpe
St Helen's Church, Thorney
All Saints' Church, Winthorpe

Organ

The church contains a small pipe organ by T.H. Nicholson. A specification of the organ can be found on the National Pipe Organ Register.

References

Church of England church buildings in Nottinghamshire
Grade I listed churches in Nottinghamshire
Newark and Sherwood